Terra Plata is a Spanish restaurant in Seattle, in the U.S. state of Washington.

Description 
Thrillist says, "Terra Plata is the Captain Planet of organic eateries, highlighting choices from air, land, and sea." Time Out says, "The epitome of an urban oasis, this rooftop patio peering over Capitol Hill doubles as an herb garden for homegrown ingredients."

History 
Chef and owner Tamara Murphy opened the restaurant in 2012.

Reception 
Thrillist's Emma Bank included the business in a 2022 list of "The Most Romantic Restaurants in Seattle" and wrote, "Terra Plata's rooftop is almost unbeatable in terms of ambiance, but let's talk about the food: hyper local and ever-evolving, Chef Tamara Murphy's menu is always in-season and always delicious." Sami Sparber included the restaurant in Axios Seattle's 2022 list of "4 must-try rooftop bars in Seattle".

See also 

 List of Spanish restaurants

References

External links 

 

2012 establishments in Washington (state)
Restaurants in Seattle
Spanish restaurants in the United States